Hermans Egleskalns (born 8 December 1990) is a Latvian volleyball player, a member of the Latvia men's national volleyball team. He currently plays for the French club Cambrai Volley.

Sporting achievements

National Championships 
2010/2011  Finnish Championship, with Perungan Pojat
 2011/2012  Belgian Championship, with Noliko Maaseik
 2017/2018  French Championship, with Tours VB
 2018/2019  French Championship, with Tours VB
2020/2021  Greek Championship, with Olympiacos

National Cups 
 2010/2011  Finnish Cup, with Perungan Pojat
2011/2012  Belgian Cup, with Noliko Maaseik
 2015/2016  Greek Cup, with Olympiacos Piraeus
 2018/2019  French Cup, with Tours VB

National Super Cups 
 
2011/2012  Belgian Super Cup, with Noliko Maaseik
 2012/2013  Belgian Super Cup, with Noliko Maaseik

National League Cups 
2015/2016  Greek League Cup, with Olympiacos Piraeus

Individually
 2010/2011: Finnish Championship – Most Valuable Player
 2016/2017 French Championship – Best Opposite
 2017/2018 French Championship – Best Spiker
 2017/2018 French Championship – Best Scorer
2020/2021 Greek Championship – Best Scorer
2020/2021 Greek Championship – Best Opposite

References

External links

 Player profile at LNV.fr
 Player profile at Volleybox.net

1990 births
Living people
Sportspeople from Riga
Latvian men's volleyball players
Latvian expatriate sportspeople in Finland
Expatriate volleyball players in Finland
Latvian expatriate sportspeople in Belgium
Expatriate volleyball players in Belgium
Latvian expatriate sportspeople in France
Expatriate volleyball players in France
Latvian expatriate sportspeople in Greece
Expatriate volleyball players in Greece
Olympiacos S.C. players